The Tonkawa language was spoken in Oklahoma, Texas, and New Mexico by the Tonkawa people.  A language isolate, with no known related languages, Tonkawa has not had L1 (first language) speakers since the mid 1900s. Most Tonkawa people now only speak English.

Phonology

Vowels

Tonkawa has 10 vowels:

 Each vowel is distinguished by the quality of sound and the length of the vowel.
 The vowels occur in five pairs that have differing vowel lengths (i.e. short vowels vs. long vowels).
 In the front and the mid back vowel pairs, the short vowels are phonetically lower than their long counterparts:  → ,  → ,  → .
 The low vowels  vary between central and back articulations: .
 Vowels that are followed by j and w are slightly raised in their position of articulation

Consonants

Tonkawa has 15 consonants:

 The other coronals  are consistently dental.
 The dorsal obstruents are produced with a palatal place of articulation before front vowels , otherwise they are velar:
  → 
 The dorsal approximants  are consistently palatal and labiovelar respectively.

Consonant clusters
There are two environments in which consonant clusters occur in Tonkawa:
 when a consonant is repeated
 when the cluster is within the syllable

Repeated or identical consonants are treated as one unit. However, the condition that causes this repetition has not been fully analyzed.
 Example:  'he scrapes it' versus  'lightning strikes him'
There are cases where the glottal stop is not used in the cluster or combination

There are certain consonants that can either begin or end in a cluster. However, if the cluster begins the syllable, there can be no intervening vowel.
 Initial Cluster Consonants: 
 Final Cluster Consonants:

Phonological processes and morphophonemics
Initial stem syllables that begin with h-
 the h- is dropped when a prefix is added
 if the syllable is C + V, then the vowel is lengthened and given the quality of the stem vowel.
 if the syllable ends in a consonant, then the initial stem forms a new syllable with the final consonant of the prefix.

Final stem syllables
 Forms: C V w or C V y
 The form changes to C  if followed by a suffix that starts with a consonant
 If a long vowel occurs the suffixes change from (-we/-/) to (- or -o//-)

An interesting feature of Tonkawan phonology is that the vowels in even-numbered syllables are reduced. That is, long vowels are shortened, while short vowels disappear. Analyses of this were given by Kisseberth (1970), Phelps (1973, 1975) and Noske (1993).

Syllable structure
The Tonkawa language is a syllabic language that bases its word and sentence prosody on even stressed syllables.
 Disyllabic words are when the stress is placed on the final syllable.
 Polysyllabic words are when the stress is moved to the next to last syllable, the penult.

There are five types of syllable arrangements: (CL consonant, CC: consonant cluster, V: vowel)
 C + V →  ka-la 'mouth'
 C + V + C →  tan-kol 'back of head'
 CC + V →   'he scrapes it'
 CC + V + C →   'lightning strikes him'
 C + V +  or / /  →  jam- 'I paint his face'

Morphology
The morphemes in Tonkawa can be divided as follows:

I. Themes
 Free – the stem can stand alone
 Bound – the stem must have a suffix or prefix attached; it cannot stand alone
In Tonkawa the theme is composed of morphologic units. The basic unit is the stem. The stem is composed of two elements (the consonant and vowel) and modified by affixes. The theme, or stem, is functional, which means it changes as more affixation is added. This leads to the fusion of the stem and affix where it becomes difficult to isolate the word into its smaller units.

II. Affixes
 Transformative – the affix changes the meaning and/or function of the word
 Verbal – the affix changes a certain aspect of the verb
 Noun and Pronoun – the affix changes a certain aspect of the noun or pronoun

III. Enclitics

Grammar
In English, pronouns, nouns, verbs, etc., are individual words; Tonkawa forms the parts of speech differently, and the most important grammatical function is affixation. This process shows the subjects, objects, and pronouns of words and/or verbs. Within affixations, the suffix has more importance than the prefix.

The differentiation between subject and object is shown in the suffix. While the word order tends to be subject-object-verb (SOV), compounding words is very common in Tonkawa. Reduplication is very common in Tonkawa and affects only the verb themes. Usually, only one syllable undergoes reduplication, and it notes a repeated action, vigorous action, or a plural subject.

Nouns

Nouns function as free themes, or stems, in Tonkawa. There is a limit of only two or three affixes that can compound with a noun. However, there are cases of a bound theme occurring in noun compounds, which occurs with the suffix -an is added. In English, pronouns and nouns are usually grouped together, but because pronouns in Tonkawa are bound themes, they will be discussed with the verb section.

Verbs

Verbs are bound morphemes that have a limit of only two themes, the second theme being the modifying theme and usually serving as an adverbial theme. However, if the suffix -/-wa is added the verb functions as a free theme.

Pronouns

Pronouns are not used except for emphasis on the subject and are affixated as prefixes. Person and number are usually indicated by the affixation of the verb. Most pronouns are bound themes, especially the demonstrative pronouns.

Demonstrative pronouns

Demonstrative adverbs can be formed by adding -ca 'place', -l 'direction', -c 'manner' to the demonstrative pronouns below.
 Example:  'that one aforementioned' + ca 'place = ' 'that place aforementioned'

Interrogative pronouns can be formed by adding the prefix he- to the demonstrative pronouns as well by using the same format for the demonstrative adverbs.
 Example: he 'interrogative' +  'this' + l 'direction' =  'where'

Indefinite pronouns can also be formed with affixation. (Interrogative + )
 Example:  'what' +  =  'anything, something, anyone, someone'

Verb suffixes

Verb suffixes are important in Tonkawa because they usually indicate the tense, negativity, and manner (outside of what is conveyed in the aforementioned prefixes) of the action performed.

Enclitics

Enclitics are bound morphemes that are suffixed to verbs, nouns, and demonstratives that end with -k. Enclitics often express modal concepts in Tonkawa, which occur in the declarative, interrogative, and quotative/narrative clauses or statements.

Writing system

The orthography used on the Tonkawa Tribe's website is similar to Americanist phonetic notation.

Long vowels are indicated with a following middle dot . The affricate  is written . The glottal stop  is written as either an apostrophe  or as a superscript question mark .  The palatal glide  is written .

The phonemic orthography used in Hoijer's Tonkawa Texts is a later version of Americanist transcription. It uses a colon for long vowels  and the traditional glottal stop symbol .
Examples are mummun 'salt' and mummunchicew 'pepper'.

Example

The following text is the first four sentences of Coyote and Jackrabbit, from Hoijer's Tonkawa Texts.

 ha·csokonayla ha·nanoklaknoˀo xamˀalˀa·yˀik.  ˀe·kʷa tanmaslakʷa·low hecne·laklaknoˀo lak.  ha·csokonayla "ˀo·c!" noklaknoˀo.  "ˀekʷanesxaw sa·ken nenxales!" noklaknoˀo.  ˀe·ta tanmaslakʷa·lowa·ˀa·lak hewleklaknoˀo.

Gloss:

 Coyote / he was going along, S / on the prairie.  When he did so / Jackrabbit / he was lying, S / (accus.).  Coyote / "Oho!" / he said, S.  "Horse /my / I have found it!" / he said, S.  And then / that Jackrabbit afm / he caught him, S.

In this gloss, S is an abbreviation for "it is said", and afm for "the aforementioned".

Vocabulary

References

Sources

 Hoijer, Harry. (1933). Tonkawa: An Indian language of Texas. New York: Columbia University. (Extract from Handbook of American Indian languages, Vol. 3).
 Hoijer, Harry. (1946). Tonkawa. in Harry Hoijer et al., Linguistic Structures of Native America, 289–311.
 Hoijer, Harry. (1949). An Analytical Dictionary of the Tonkawa Language. Berkeley, CA: University of California Publications in Linguistics 5.
 Hoijer, Harry. (1972). Tonkawa Texts. Berkeley, CA: University of California Publications in Linguistics 73.
 
 Kisseberth, Charles. (1970). Vowel Elision in Tonkawa and Derivational Constraints. In: Sadock, J.L., & A.L. Vanek (Eds), Studies Presentend to Robert B. Lees by his students. Champaign, IL: Linguistic Research, 109–137.
 Mithun, Marianne. (1999). The Languages of Native North America. Cambridge: Cambridge University Press, 1999.
 Noske, Roland. (1993). A Theory of Syllabification and Segmental Alternation. With studies on the phonology of French, German, Tonkawa and Yawelmani. Tübingen: Niemeyer.
 Phelps, Elaine F. (1973). Tonkawa, Sundanese and Kasem. Some problems in Generative Phonology. Ph.D. dissertation, University of Washington, Seattle.
 Phelps, Elaine F. (1975). Iteration and Disjunctive Domains in Phonology. Linguistic Analysis 1, 137–172.
 "The Tonkawa Language: Pronunciation Key". Retrieved October 12, 2005.

External links

The Tonkawa Language, includes online Tonkawa dictionary
Tonkawa Indian Language
OLAC resources in and about the Tonkawa language

 
Language isolates of North America
Extinct languages of North America
Indigenous languages of Oklahoma
Indigenous languages of the North American Plains
Indigenous languages of Texas
Languages extinct in the 1940s
Coahuiltecan languages